Tegera Arena (formerly Ejendals Arena) is an arena in Leksand, Sweden primarily used for ice hockey. It was opened in October 2005, and is the home arena of Leksands IF. It holds 7,650 people.

History

Construction of a new arena, replacing the former Leksands ishall from 1966, was announced on 27 April 2004. Construction began on 5 July the same year, and the first ice hockey game inside the arenas was played on 3 October 2005 when Leksands IF lost, 3–4, against Linköpings HC in the Swedish Hockey League. The arenas was officially inaugurated by County-Governor Ingrid Dahlberg of Dalarna on 11 November 2005.

The arena hosted games during the 2007 World Junior Ice Hockey Championships, together with FM Mattsson Arena in Mora. The following season, the 2007 4 Nations Cup was played at Tegera Arena. The current attendance record for ice hockey is 8,017. However, the maximum capacity has since been reduced to 7,650 due to safety regulations. Until fall 2010 the name was Ejendals Arena, but the company owning the name rights decided they wanted to promote a brand instead of their company name.

Events

See also
Leksands IF
List of indoor arenas in Sweden

References

External links

Pictures and facts (unofficial)

Indoor arenas in Sweden
Indoor ice hockey venues in Sweden
Ice hockey venues in Sweden
Buildings and structures in Dalarna County
Sport in Leksand
2005 establishments in Sweden
Sports venues completed in 2005